The 2009 Coupe Internationale de Nice was the 14th edition of an annual international figure skating competition held in Nice, France. It was held between November 4 and 8, 2009. Skaters competed in the disciplines of men's singles, ladies' singles, pair skating, and ice dancing on the levels of senior and junior. Unlike most other competitions, there was no compulsory dance segment in the ice dancing competition.

Senior results

Men

Ladies

Pairs

Ice dancing

Junior results

Men

Ladies

External links
 
 

Coupe Internationale de Nice
Coupe Internationale De Nice, 2009